Eric Ungar is an American saxophonist, flautist and guitarist. He is perhaps best recognized as a founding member of the jazz fusion ensemble Alter Natives as well as his contributions to the group Hotel X. Ungar left the Alter Natives after the release of their second album Group Therapy, causing the band to embrace a more progressive rock style.

Discography 
Alter Natives
Hold Your Tongue (SST, 1986)
Group Therapy (SST, 1988)
Appears on
Lawndale: Sasquatch Rock (SST, 1987)
Hotel X: Uncommon Grounds (SST, 1996)

References 

Living people
Alter Natives members
American jazz saxophonists
American male saxophonists
American punk rock saxophonists
21st-century American saxophonists
21st-century American male musicians
American male jazz musicians
Year of birth missing (living people)